Project Hail Mary is a 2021 science fiction novel by American novelist Andy Weir.  Set in the near future, it centers on junior high (middle) school-teacher-turned-astronaut Ryland Grace, who wakes up from a coma afflicted with amnesia. He gradually remembers that he was sent to the Tau Ceti solar system, 12 light-years from Earth, to find a means of reversing a solar dimming event that could cause the extinction of humanity. 

It received generally positive reviews, and was a finalist for the 2022 Hugo Award for Best Novel. The unabridged audiobook is read by Ray Porter. Film rights have been purchased by Metro-Goldwyn-Mayer. Drew Goddard (who adapted The Martian, Weir's traditional publishing debut, into a 2015 film) is slated to adapt the book into a film, in which actor Ryan Gosling plans to star as Grace.

Plot

Narrative structure 
The story follows two storylines, each told chronologically. Starting with the story on board the spacecraft Hail Mary where Ryland Grace regains his memory in bursts. This story is frequently intercut with flashbacks revealing earlier events leading up to the launch of the Hail Mary.

Before launch 
In the near future, a global dimming event is observed, coinciding with the formation of a bright line from the Sun to Venus. The exponential rate of dimming is calculated to result in a catastrophic ice age within 30 years. A space probe is used to discover that the line appears to contain alien microbes. The world's governments cooperate, giving former European Space Agency (ESA) administrator Eva Stratt unilateral authority and legal immunity to solve the problem.

Stratt nominates Ryland Grace, a teacher and former molecular biologist, as the first person to study a sample of the organism recovered from Venus, as she views him as expendable. He discovers that the single-celled organism consumes all forms of electromagnetic radiation and uses radiant energy to move. Since the organism consumes energy from the Sun, Grace names it "Astrophage" (Greek for "star eater"). Grace subsequently discovers that Astrophage reproduces using carbon dioxide, commonly found on Venus. Other scientists discover that Astrophage employs mass–energy conversion via neutrinos, and can be mass-bred for use as rocket fuel.

Astronomy data reveals that Astrophage has also infected and dimmed nearby stars, but one star, Tau Ceti, has unexpectedly resisted Astrophage infection. An Astrophage-fueled starship, the Hail Mary, is developed to travel to Tau Ceti to obtain knowledge of Astrophage resistance, and to return the findings to Earth with unmanned mini-ships ("beetles", with each named after their respective Beatle counterpart). Hail Mary can only be fueled and supplied for a one-way trip, making it a suicide mission.

Stratt orders the release of methane from Antarctica to reduce global cooling, but the threat of famine and wars over food on Earth remains for the 26 years that the Hail Mary mission is expected to take.

Since the crew of three astronauts will travel under a coma to avoid psychiatric issues, potential astronauts are restricted to people with coma-resistant genes, including Grace. Stratt tasks Grace to train the science experts for the mission, but the science experts are killed in an Astrophage-induced explosion shortly before launch. With no time to train a replacement, Stratt asks Grace to join the mission. When he declines, she forces him. Grace threatens sabotage, so a sedative is administered to him before launch, with a temporary amnesia-inducing drug set to be administered shortly before he awakens.

Aboard the Hail Mary 
Ryland Grace emerges from his coma with no memory of his identity or situation. As the mission proceeds, Grace deduces his situation while his memory returns gradually. Grace finds that his crew members have died en route, and gives them a space burial.

Hail Mary soon reaches Tau Ceti, and is approached by an alien starship, which Grace names "Blip-A". The other ship indicates that its home system in 40 Eridani is also plagued by Astrophage infection. Blip-A docks with Hail Mary, and its occupant meets Grace. Grace develops a system to communicate with the spider-like alien, whom Grace names "Rocky" due to its stone-like exoskeleton. Rocky, a skilled engineer, has been in the Tau Ceti system for 46 years as the last survivor of his crew; Grace deduces that the others died from space radiation, an unknown concept to Eridians.

Also unfamiliar with the concept of relativity, the Eridians greatly overestimated the amount of fuel needed for a round-trip to Tau Ceti, and the Blip-A has enough Astrophage fuel for both ships to return to their planets. Grace realizes that what was once a suicide mission now may end with him returning to Earth. He fantasizes about confronting Stratt for coercing him to go.

Grace and Rocky discover the Astrophage's home planet in orbit around Tau Ceti, which they name Adrian, after Rocky Balboa’s wife. The planet's atmosphere is found to contain a natural predator of Astrophage. While collecting a sample from Adrian, a hull breach occurs and Rocky risks his life to save Grace. Grace is severely burned when saving Rocky, who sustained severe injuries but eventually recovers. From the sample, the Astrophage predator is found to be a microbe which Grace names "Taumoeba".

After a Taumoeba outbreak on the Hail Mary, where all fuel in the ship's tanks are consumed, Grace and Rocky are captured in a decaying orbit over Adrian. They escape by mounting, and controlling, the beetles on the ship's hull. Grace and Rocky use selective breeding to produce nitrogen-resistant and pressure-tolerant Taumoeba for their home systems.

Rocky refuels the Hail Mary, and they part ways. En route, Grace discovers that he has accidentally bred into the Taumoeba the ability to permeate and escape their containers. Although Grace fixes the problem on Hail Mary, he realizes that the Blip-A is made of the same material as those containers, and that the Taumoeba has consumed the fuel and crippled the ship, leaving Rocky stranded.

Due to limited food, Grace is forced to choose between personally returning to Earth as a hero but dooming the Eridians, or saving Rocky and the Eridians while he himself would starve on Erid. Grace chooses the latter, sending the beetles back to Earth with the Taumoeba, while he locates the fuel-less Blip-A and reunites with Rocky three months after their departure. Rocky is overjoyed and points out that Grace could eat Taumoebas, thus possibly solving Grace's food shortage.

They return to Erid, fixing the Eridians' Astrophage problem. Using the digital archive of human knowledge given to Grace by Stratt, the Eridians build a system to enable Grace to live on Erid, where he becomes a teacher of Eridian young. Some years later, Rocky tells Grace that the Astrophage infection around the Sun has abated too, meaning Grace's mission was a success and that Earth's scientists figured out a solution less than a year after the return of the beetles. Knowing that humanity has survived on Earth, Grace considers returning to Earth, with the Hail Mary still operational and in orbit around Erid.

Characters 
 Ryland Grace – The novel's protagonist, a disillusioned molecular biologist who becomes a junior high school science teacher before being recruited to study Astrophage by Eva Stratt.
 Eva Stratt – A Dutch woman, previously an administrator at the European Space Agency, who is subsequently given absolute authority to stop Astrophage, leading to the Hail Mary mission. Weir describes Stratt, along with Grace, as the two human "heroes" of the book.
 Rocky – An alien engineer from the 40 Eridani system whose planet is simultaneously threatened by Astrophage. Due to his proximity to radiation-shielding Astrophage fuel, he survives space radiation while his crew mates do not. Rocky eventually encounters the Hail Mary and works together with Grace.
 Yáo Li-Jie – The intended commander of Hail Marys crew. He dies en route to Tau Ceti.
 Olesya Ilyukhina – The intended engineer and EVA specialist of Hail Mary’s crew, ribald yet cheerful. She dies en route to Tau Ceti.
 Dr. Lokken – A Norwegian scientist who assists in the design of the Hail Mary and its rotational gravity. She has a short rivalry with Grace over an academic paper he wrote.
 Dimitri Komorov – A Russian scientist who develops the Astrophage-based propulsion system for the Hail Mary and discovers its mass-conversion properties.
 Steve Hatch – A researcher from the University of British Columbia. He develops the "Beetle" probes and is an avid Beatle fan. He is described as very talkative and optimistic.
 Martin DuBois – An American man and original science advisor on the Hail Mary mission. He dies in an explosion nine days before launch. He is described as honest and gregarious.
 Annie Shapiro – The original backup science advisor on the Hail Mary mission. She dies with Martin in the same explosion.
 Robert Redell – A solar energy expert from New Zealand. Arrested for embezzlement and the death of seven technicians in a testing accident, he develops a method to breed Astrophage rapidly.
 François Leclerc – A French climatologist who helps to slow down the climate changes caused by the Astrophage absorbing the sun's energy through the development of a method releasing trapped methane embedded in Antarctic ice sheets into the atmosphere through the use of fusion bombs.

Production 

In a profile in The New York Times, Weir says that after completing The Martian, he began a multi-volume space opera called Zhek, about a substance that could absorb electromagnetic radiation and be used as a fuel for interstellar travel. He wrote 75,000 words before abandoning the project and beginning his novel Artemis (2017). Several elements from Zhek were brought over to Project Hail Mary, including a ruthless bureaucrat character, and an energy-absorbing substance used as starship fuel.

Publication 
Project Hail Mary was released on May 4, 2021, by Ballantine Books. It is available in hardcover, e-book, and audiobook formats. The audiobook narrated by Ray Porter uses melodic sound effects in the background whenever "Rocky" speaks.

Reception 
Project Hail Mary has received generally positive reviews. Writing for The New York Times, sci-fi author Alec Nevala-Lee wrote "For readers who can forgive its shortcomings, the result is an engaging space odyssey." Kirkus Reviews gave the book a starred review, describing it as "An unforgettable story of survival and the power of friendship—nothing short of a science-fiction masterwork."

In writing her review for The Washington Post, SFWA president and science fiction writer Mary Robinette Kowal mentions that there are plenty of things to love about this book, such as Grace's infectious enthusiasm for science. At the same time, Kowal mentions some of the many flaws in the novel, such as the lack of the use of checklists, which are very important in the fields of aviation, astronautics, and medicine in reducing human-induced errors which Grace seems to ignore and could have prevented him from creating his many errors in judgment.

A reviewer for Locus Magazine wrote, "Project Hail Mary, however, isn’t a simple rehash of The Martian. Instead, it’s a celebration of Weir’s voice... Weir’s jaunty blend of science and fiction in Project Hail Mary is a return to the work that got him where he is." The reviewer for The Boston Globe wrote that "Project Hail Mary is still a suspenseful space yarn that zigs and zags — sometimes literally — in ingenious directions."

Project Hail Mary debuted at number 3 on The New York Times Best Seller list for Combined Print & E-Book Fiction in May 2021. By August 2021, the book had been on the NYT list for 9 weeks. Project Hail Mary additionally achieved the #1 spot on the New York Times Audio Fiction Best Seller List for three weeks in February 2022.

The novel debuted at number 2 on the Los Angeles Times SoCal Bestsellers for Hardcover Fiction and number 6 on The Wall Street Journal Bestselling Books List for Hardcover Fiction during the same month. The book was still on the L.A. Times list in mid-August.

In August 2021, Project Hail Mary debuted at number 1 on the Locus Bestsellers list for hardcovers while remaining at the top position for five consecutive months before dropping to a lower position while still remaining on the list for 11 consecutive months by June 2022.  , the novel remained on the above-mentioned bestseller lists.

Bill Gates and Barack Obama added the book to their respective 2021 book recommendations.

Awards 
 2021 Dragon Award for Best Science Fiction Novel
 2021 Best Science Fiction, Goodreads Choice Awards
 2022 Audie Award for Science Fiction
 2022 Audie Award for Audiobook of the Year
 2022 Seiun Award Best Translated Long Work

Film adaptation 
Weir sold the book's film adaptation rights to Metro-Goldwyn-Mayer in early 2020 for $3 million. Actor Ryan Gosling plans to produce and star as Ryland Grace. It will be directed and produced by filmmaking duo Phil Lord and Christopher Miller. Its screenwriter will be Drew Goddard, and Ken Kao will produce with Ryan Gosling via their production banner Arcana.

References 

2021 American novels
American science fiction novels
NASA in fiction
Fiction set around Tau Ceti
Ballantine Books books
2021 science fiction novels
Works by Andy Weir